Chicano rap is a subgenre of hip hop that embodies aspects of Southwest Mexican American or Chicano culture. It is typically performed by rappers and musicians of Mexican descent.

History

Early years
The first widely recognized Chicano rap artist was former electro musician Kid Frost.  His 1990 debut album Hispanic Causing Panic was driven by the hit single "La Raza",  which combined Latin and Tex-Mex influences, to bring new attention to Chicano rappers on the West Coast.  Another early and well known Chicano rapper was Cuban-American artist Mellow Man Ace.  Ace was the first Latino artist to have a major bilingual single attached to his 1989 debut. Although Mellow Man often used Chicano slang as a result of his East Los Angeles upbringing, Kid Frost receives the credit as the first major Chicano rapper given Mellow Man's Cuban descent. Mellow Man, referred to as the "Godfather of Latin Rap", brought mainstream attention to Spanglish rhyming with his platinum single "Mentirosa", which was based on a riff from the song "Evil Ways" by Chicano rock musician Carlos Santana. In 1990, A.L.T. released the album Another Latin Timebomb, featuring his hit remake of the song "Tequila". In 1990, the Chicano hip hop group A Lighter Shade of Brown released their album Brown & Proud, which included hits "On a Sunday Afternoon" (a top 40 hit on the Billboard Hot 100) and "Latin Active". Cypress Hill, of which Mellow Man Ace was a member before going solo, would sometimes use popular Chicano slang and culture in their music and videos.  The lead rapper, B-Real, was also of Mexican descent, making him Chicano. They were the first Latino rap group to reach platinum status, with Big Pun credited as the first Latino solo artist to reach platinum sales for an LP. Cypress Hill has also collaborated with another Chicano group, Psycho Realm. Chicano rap derives from American rap which bases its music on drum beats, jazz music, and bass amongst others. Early influences for Chicano rap include "oldies", funk music and later incorporated conjunto and banda.   Stemming from a long culture of mestizaje,  Chicano rap uses samples from African Diaspora music and complex rhythmic structures, which reflect the impact of black culture on the genre. Chicano can differentiate itself by sometimes having acoustic guitars playing Spanish melodies in the background or intros with Mexican regional music beats. Chicano Rap can be distinguished by sometimes having both English and Spanish verses. Some of the common themes within Chicano rap include but are not limited to: Love, experiences of being Mexican in the United States of America, Political problems, inequality, but also drug usage and money. Chicano rap often include narratives that include gang violence and life in the varrio, by using lyrics in 'Spanglish', Chicano rap embraces the reality of being Mexican-American.

1990s
During the late 1980s and 90s Chicano rap was brought by artist who shared their personal experiences through their lyrics.

In the mid-1990s, Eazy-E formed the group Brownside.  Consisting of members Wicked, Klever, and Trouble, Brownside was essentially the Chicano equivalent of N.W.A.  Drawing their experiences in society into their music, Brownside illustrated the harsh realities of life and the Chicano experience.

Jonny Z, a Chicano rapper from San Diego, is considered to be a pioneer of Latin hip-hop. He earned four Billboard Hot Dance singles during 1993–1997, including the Miami bass song, "Shake Shake (Shake That Culo)".

The Oxford encyclopedia of Latinos and Latinas in the United States Volume 2, Page 301 states: "A new style of Latina and Latino hip-hop was created in Miami and Texas by the bass rappers DJ Laz and Jonny Z, who mixed Latin styles with bass music."

During the 1990s, some Chicano rappers such as Sinful of the Mexicanz began using influences from Mexican music in their beats and delivery, although this subgenre of music is sometimes referred to today as "urban regional" and not always representative of Chicano rap. The hip hop group Akwid also combines traditional Mexican regional music with hip hop vocals.

Starting from the release of his 1995 album, Smile Now, Die Later, Kid Frost began to include the issues of immigration and drug trafficking related to the US- Mexico border by incorporating the sound of narcocorridos into his raps, further establishing the connection between Mexican folk music and Chicano rap.

Present day
One of the most widely recognized Chicano rappers today is Lil Rob of San Diego, his album "Natural High/High Till I Die" sold 90,000 copies and his single "Summer Nights" was considered a major crossover and received heavy rotation on radio stations and video programs not directly related to Chicano rap music. This widely successful artist has recently reappeared in the limelight, with the song Summer Nights being used in TikTok trends, and even being sampled in Destiny Roger's 2022 hit by the same name. Another widely known Chicano rapper is Serio of Los Angeles, with his 2012 single "Don't Hate Me Because I'm Mexican" featuring Proper Dos and "Conejo", a controversial song that called for immigration reform.

A Chicano rap scene has also begun to emerge in Texas. Prominent Texan artists in the genre include South Park Mexican (SPM) and Dope House Records. SPM's sound includes influences similarly seen in the scene of West Coast Chicano rap: Latin beats, gangsta narratives, and G-Funk, however SPM differentiates itself by including sounds and vocabulary unique to the Houston hip hop scene with the newly added influence of corporate rap.
 
Many Chicano rappers have been heavily influenced by Mexican history, including many themes relevant to the Mexican and Chicano people living in the United States and Mexico. Chicano rap is mainly enjoyed by hip hop listeners in the United States, but also has established a cult fan base in Australia and the Philippines. Its main audience, however, consists of Hispanics/Latinos living on the West Coast, the Southwest, and the Midwest. Chicano culture has even reached Japan, where a small minority dresses in flannels and baggy pants, drives lowriders, and listens to Chicano rap. The Chicano rap style and culture's introduction in Japan can be attributed to Mexican-American soldiers stationed in Japan. Although there have been some concerns over cultural appropriation between these outcroppings of Chicano-style culture in other countries, comments under YouTube videos and reviews of music made by non-Chicanos has generally been positive. Many Chicanos choose to look at this outcropping as a sort of appreciation of their culture, rather than appropriation.  Chicano rap's ability to reach large audiences without mainstream airplay or media promotion is due largely in part to nationwide lowrider car tours and their accompanying concerts headlined by Chicano rappers. This environment allows Chicano rap artists to earn significant incomes through independent label releases while promoting directly to a target audience.

See also
Latin hip hop
List of Chicano rappers
G-funk
Chicano rock
Mexican hip hop

References

External links
Chicano Rap Source for Chicano rap news and interviews.
Brown Pride A collection of texts and links about Chicano rap and culture.
Chicano Rap Source for Chicano rap artists, videos and much more.

 
American hip hop genres
Rap
Latin hip hop
Mexican-American culture
Mexican styles of music
Hispanic American music
Music of Los Angeles
Music of California